Walker Island is an island located close to the south-western coast of Tasmania, Australia. The  island is part of the Maatsuyker Islands Group, and comprise part of the Southwest National Park and the Tasmanian Wilderness World Heritage Site.

Fauna
Walker Island is part of the Maatsuyker Island Group Important Bird Area, identified as such by BirdLife International because of its importance as a breeding site for seabirds. Recorded breeding seabird and wader species are the little penguin (2-300 pairs), short-tailed shearwater (146,000 pairs), fairy prion (3,000 pairs), common diving-petrel (500 pairs), silver gull and sooty oystercatcher.  The island is a haul-out site for the Australian fur seal and an occasional breeding site for the New Zealand fur seal.  The Tasmanian tree skink is present.

See also

 South East Cape
 South West Cape
 List of islands of Tasmania

References

Islands of South West Tasmania
Protected areas of Tasmania
Important Bird Areas of Tasmania